Anil Tickoo is a stage actor in the Dogri and Hindi language, and a prominent figure in Jammu and Kashmir Theatre.

Awards
He has won numerous National awards in his career, including prestigious Sangeet Natak Akademi Award for the year 2017 in Acting. He was the first recipient from Jammu & Kashmir.

Contribution to theatre
Anil has also acted in more than 200 stage plays. Prominent among them included film Ghulab Gatha, plays Bawa Jitto, Mahabhoj, Ghumayee, Bhoma, Ghera, Comedy of Terrors, Suno Eh Kahani, Kanjoos, Fandi, Holi, Poster, Aap Hamare Hain Kaun, Rakt-Beej, Kowva Chala Hans Ki Chaal, Bichoo, Kabira Khada bazaar Mein, Allar Goli Veer Sipahi, Tax Free, Rishta and Sainyan Bhaye Kotwal.

Career
Considered as one of the most celebrated actor of Indian theatre, Anil Tickoo has the credit of having participated over 150 national and international theatre festivals including Frankfurt International Theatre Festival, Frankfurt (Germany), Days of India in Russia and National Day Celebrations of Bhutan. Over the last twenty–nine years he has continuously worked in the field of theatre as actor and had been a part of projects like Theatre for Mass Motivation and the Theatre for Population education supported by UNESCO and UNICEF. He is also one of the leading instructors of Natrang Children's Weekend Club. In recognition to his contribution as an innovative actor, he received the junior fellowship from the Department of Culture, Govt. of India.

Anil has directed over twenty plays for Natrang including Baba Ki Jai Ho, Damaad, Panja, Natak Nahein, Khel Ghar, Refund, Chehre, Salvaton Mein Sanwaad, Baje Dhindhora, Kya Yeh Sach Hai and Tankara Ka Gaana. His directorial works were much appreciated for scenic design and creative lighting.

See also
 Dogri
 Balwant Thakur
 Moti Lal Kemmu

References

External links
 

1970 births
Living people
Recipients of the Sangeet Natak Akademi Award